The Midco Arena in Sioux Falls, South Dakota is a planned 3,000-seat ice hockey arena on the campus of Augustana University. The arena broke ground on October 5, 2021.

History
Plans for Augustana University to begin playing varsity ice hockey began as far back as 2018 when the school's athletic department decided to move its programs to the NCAA Division I level. The school formally announced that it was strongly considering adding a men's ice hockey program in the summer of 2021 but, as the school did not have a sufficient rink at their disposal, the goal was only tentative. Less than 4 months later, the school announced they were officially adding the program for the 2023–24 season when they broke ground for the Midco Arena.

Namesake
Midco is a regional cable provider for North and South Dakota. The company was one of several organizations and persons to donate money to Augustana University for the purpose of founding their ice hockey program.

References

External links

Augustana (South Dakota) Vikings men's ice hockey
College ice hockey venues in the United States
Indoor ice hockey venues in the United States
Sports venues in Sioux Falls, South Dakota